Kimura (written:  lit. "tree village") is the 17th most common Japanese surname. Notable people with the surname include:

, Japanese novelist
, Japanese footballer
, Japanese botanist
, Japanese idol and singer
, Japanese footballer
, Japanese singer
, also known as Yuka Inokuchi, Japanese voice actress 
, Japanese hurdler
, Japanese erotic artist
, Japanese politician
, Japanese footballer and manager
, Japanese rower
, Japanese painter
, Japanese field hockey player
, Japanese film director and cinematographer
Darren Kimura (born 1974), American businessman
Doreen Kimura (1933–2013), Canadian psychologist
Dustin Kimura (born 1989), American mixed martial artist
, Japanese swimmer
, Japanese audio director
, Japanese baseball player
, Japanese actress
, Japanese professional wrestler
, Japanese general
, Japanese writer, artist and animator
, Japanese businessman
, Japanese video game designer
, Japanese astronomer
, Japanese politician
, Japanese photographer
, Japanese actor
Izumi Kimura (born 1973), Japanese classical pianist
, Japanese supercentenarian
Jon Kimura Parker (born 1959), Canadian pianist
, Japanese voice actress
, Japanese baseball player
, Japanese singer
, Japanese political scientist
, Japanese scientist
, Japanese shogi player
, Japanese high jumper
, Japanese footballer and manager
Keichi Kimura (1914–1988), American painter and illustrator
, Japanese photographer
, Japanese Paralympic swimmer
, Japanese professional wrestler
, Japanese architect
, Japanese rugby union player
, Japanese volleyball player
, Japanese scholar, artist and art connoisseur
, Japanese alpine skier
, Japanese businessman
, Japanese mixed martial artist
, Japanese table tennis player
, Japanese footballer and manager
, Japanese suffragist, actress, dancer, theatre manager and magazine editor
, Japanese footballer
Kozaemon Kimura (木村小左衛門; 1888–1952), Japanese businessman and politician 
, Japanese professional wrestler and mixed martial artist
Larry Kimura, American linguist
, Japanese voice actress and singer
, Japanese footballer
, better known as Kimurayama Mamoru, Japanese sumo wrestler
, Japanese classical violinist and composer
, Japanese academic
, Japanese voice actor
, Japanese judoka and professional wrestler
, Japanese bonsai artist
, Japanese footballer
, Japanese golfer
, Japanese handball player
, Imperial Japanese Navy admiral
, Japanese cross-country skier
, Japanese video game designer
, Japanese manga artist
Minoru Kimura (born 1993), Brazilian kickboxer
, Japanese artist
, Japanese rower
, Japanese biologist and theoretical population geneticist
, Japanese footballer
, Japanese women's footballer
, Japanese professional wrestler
, Japanese actor
, Japanese voice actor
, Japanese baseball player
, Japanese synchronized swimmer
, Japanese volleyball player
, Japanese water polo player
, Japanese footballer
, Japanese samurai
, Japanese samurai
, Japanese anime director
, Japanese sprinter
Shinya Kimura, motorcycle builder
, Japanese diplomat
, Japanese boxer
, Japanese baseball player and cricketer
, Japanese baseball player
, Japanese footballer
, Japanese swimmer and journalist
, Japanese actor, voice actor and singer
Sueko Matsueda Kimura (1912–2001), American artist
, Imperial Japanese Navy admiral
, Japanese actress
, Japanese politician
, Japanese animator, illustrator and character designer
, Japanese footballer and manager
, Japanese water polo player
, Japanese businessman
, Japanese art director, writer and film director
, Japanese screenwriter
, Japanese actor and singer
, Japanese baseball player
Taky Kimura (1924–2021), American martial arts practitioner and instructor
, Japanese journalist
, Japanese politician
, Japanese footballer
, Japanese film producer, critic and music producer
, Japanese footballer
, Japanese long-distance runner
, Japanese politician
, Japanese rugby union player
, Japanese swimmer
, Japanese artist
Umejiro Kimura (1869–1927), Japanese philatelist
, Japanese long jumper
, Japanese botanist
, Japanese actress, voice actress and singer
, Japanese politician
, Japanese shogi player
, Japanese singer and musician
, Japanese boxer
, Japanese footballer
, Japanese footballer
, better known as Yukipoyo, Japanese model and television personality
, Japanese baseball player

Fictional characters
Kimura (character), a character in Marvel Comics
, a character in the manga series Azumanga Daioh
Kimura, a character in the manga series Shōnen to Inu
, a character in the manga series Sayonara Zetsubō Sensei
Katsu Kimura, an arms dealer in the animated film Spies in Disguise
, a character in the anime Digimon Frontier
, a character in the manga series Assassination Classroom
, a character in the anime series Danganronpa 3: The End of Hope's Peak High School
Shunji Kimura, a character in the television series Bridal Mask
, a character in the manga series Hajime no Ippo

See also
Kimura spider, a spider named after its discoverer, Arika Kimura
Kimura lock, a type of armlock named after Masahiko Kimura

References

Japanese-language surnames